Nathalia Melo-Wilson, née Nathalia Melo Moreira, (born January 19, 1984) is a Brazilian-born American IFBB Pro fitness and figure competitor (bikini category), fitness model, and personal trainer. She is the winner of 2012 Bikini Olympia.

Career
Nathalia Melo-Wilson was born in Porto Alegre, Brazil. She is of Italian-Brazilian descent. Melo moved to the United States in 2004 and competed at local NPC events, starting with 2009 Ft. Lauderdale Cup where she won the Bikini Overall. She got her IFBB Pro Card in 2010, the year IFBB officially recognised the bikini competition category.

References

External links
Nathalia Melo Official Website

1984 births
Living people
People from Porto Alegre
American people of Brazilian descent
Brazilian people of Italian descent
American people of Italian descent
Fitness and figure competitors
American exercise instructors
Brazilian expatriates in the United States